Below is a list of state and regional California high school basketball champions sanctioned by the California Interscholastic Federation.

Boys State Champions

Girls State Champions

Boys Northern California Champions

Girls Northern California Champions

Boys Southern California Champions

Girls Southern California Champions

Notes

References

High school basketball in the United States
California high school athletic leagues